FreshChoice is a franchise of locally owned and operated supermarkets across New Zealand.

The stores are operated under franchise agreements with Wholesale Distributors Ltd (WDL), a division of Woolworths New Zealand, one of New Zealand's largest retail and distribution companies.

There are 33 FreshChoice stores across New Zealand, including five in Auckland.

History

The franchise was established in 1995.

By 2008, it had 15 stores but was yet to expand into Auckland.

References

External links
 Official website

Retail companies established in 1995
Supermarkets of New Zealand
Woolworths Group (Australia)
New Zealand companies established in 1995